Paul Anthony "Paulie" Ayala (born April 22, 1970) is an American former professional boxer who competed from 1992 to 2004. He was a multiple division World champion who held the  WBA bantamweight title, and the IBO super bantamweight title. In 1999 he was voted "Fighter of the Year" by The Ring magazine for his first bout against Johnny Tapia, which also won "Fight of the Year" honors.

Professional career
Ayala began his professional fighting career with a six-round decision win over Jaime Olvera on November 27, 1992. He had seven fights in 1993, including one against future NABO champion and world title challenger Jesse Magana. Ayala won all seven of those bouts, four by knockout. Magana was knocked out in the fourth round, after which Ayala went on to score wins over prospects Evgeny Novoselov and George Acevedo.

In 1994, he won all four of his bouts, including one over veteran Lee Cargle. Cargle was knocked out by Ayala in round three. 1995 was a productive year for Ayala, who won all five of his fights, including his first regional championship bout. By defeating Mike Espinoza by knockout in three rounds at the Fort Worth Convention Center, Ayala claimed the NABF bantamweight title. He defended it twice before the end of the year, beating Mario Diaz and Sergio Millan, both by decision in 12 rounds.

Ayala only had two fights in 1996, both of them successful defenses of his NABF title. In the first, he knocked out Roland Gomez in seven rounds but was forced to take a seven-month layoff due to a broken Hand. Returning to the ring in September, Ayala defeated Ivan Alvarez by decision in twelve to retain the NABF bantamweight title.

He began 1997 by defeating Cuauhtemoc Gomez by decision in twelve, once again retaining his belt as the headliner at the Tropicana Casino in Atlantic City, New Jersey. Ayala won three more bouts that year, defeating heavy-handed puncher Nestor Lopez in a co-main event feature on an HBO pay-per-view card, headlining at The Orleans in Paradise, Nevada with a fifth-round knockout over Roberto Lopez to retain the NABF belt. This was followed by another HBO PPV appearance, in which Ayala won a unanimous decision against Ricardo Medina.

At the beginning of 1998, Ayala was very close to a world championship bout. Fighting two more bouts, he received his first chance at a world title by becoming the mandatory contender for the WBC belt. Ayala then traveled to Japan to challenge WBC bantamweight champion Joichiro Tatsuyoshi on August 23. Ayala lost the fight by a sixth-round technical decision when the fight was stopped due to a cut. Tatsuyoshi came out fast in the opening rounds, but Ayala rallied back to win the fifth and sixth rounds unanimously. During the fight, an accidental clash of heads caused a cut and Ayala was docked 2 points. The fight was stopped in round seven due to the severity of the cut, sending the decision to the scorecards and thereby handing victory to Tatsuyoshi.

WBA bantamweight title
After a win against Ivan Salazar, Ayala began 1999 by beating David Vazquez by decision in ten. Unable to secure a rematch with Tatsuyoshi, Ayala nonetheless got his second chance at becoming a world champion, this time against WBA bantamweight champion Johnny Tapia. The fight took place in Las Vegas on June 26. Ayala handed Tapia his first career loss and became world champion by winning a twelve-round unanimous decision, in what turned out to be both Ayala's Showtime debut and The Ring magazine's Fight of the Year for 1999.

Ayala retained his title against WBA #1 contender Sithai Condo before the end of that year, earning The Ring magazine Fighter of the Year honours. In his second title defense, he defeated Johnny Bredahl via twelve-round decision. On October 7, 2000, Ayala and Tapia met in a rematch for the vacant IBA featherweight title, at a catchweight of 124 lbs. As with the first fight, this took place on Showtime. Due to Tapia being unable to make the bantamweight limit, Ayala's WBA bantamweight title was not at stake. Ayala defeated Tapia once again by a twelve-round unanimous decision, a result which was seen as controversial.

On March 30, 2001, Ayala recovered from a fourth-round knockdown to retain his WBA bantamweight title with a twelve-round decision against Hugo Dianzo in an ESPN telecast bout. Ayala then vacated his title in order to move up in weight.

Super bantamweight
On August 4, 2001, Ayala challenged world champion Clarence Adams, who had vacated his WBA super bantamweight title in order to face Ayala for the vacant IBO title. Ayala defeated Adams via split decision. In a rematch of their closely contested bout, Ayala successfully defended his IBO title by defeating Adams in a wide unanimous decision. Both bouts were featured on HBO telecasts.

Featherweight
Continuing his rise in weight, on November 16, 2002 Ayala met world champion Érik Morales for the vacant WBC featherweight title, this time winding up on the losing end of a twelve-round unanimous decision.

Ayala returned to the ring on November 15, 2003, dropping back down to super bantamweight and defeating Edel Ruiz in a ten-round unanimous decision in Fort Worth, Texas. On June 19, 2004 in Los Angeles, Ayala once again ventured into the featherweight division. In a losing effort against fellow former world champion Marco Antonio Barrera, Ayala was knocked out in ten rounds. In September of that year, Ayala surprised many of his boxing fans by announcing his retirement from the sport.

Punching Out Parkinson's
Following retirement, Ayala has contributed to helping those who suffer from Parkinson's disease. In Fort Worth, Texas at his University of Hard Knocks gym, Ayala started a program to help Parkinson's patients. Using his expertise, he teaches non-contact boxing techniques to regain coordination, strength and balance in order to improve the quality of life for his students and create an environment of camaraderie.

Professional boxing record

References

External links
Official website

1970 births
Living people
American boxers of Mexican descent
Boxers from Texas
Sportspeople from Fort Worth, Texas
Southpaw boxers
World boxing champions
American male boxers
Bantamweight boxers